Anchorage is the most populous city in the U.S. state of Alaska.

Anchorage may also refer to:

Places 
 Anchorage, Kentucky, a city
 Anchorage, Texas, an unincorporated community
 Anchorage, Wisconsin, a ghost town
 The Anchorage, Rhode Island, a former census-designated place

Arts, entertainment, and media

Songs
 "Anchorage" (song), a 1988 song by Michelle Shocked
 "anchorage", a song by Relient K from their 2000 self-titled album
 "Anchorage", a song by Surfer Blood from their 2010 album Astro Coast

Transport
 Anchorage (maritime), a location where a boat or other vessel lies at anchor
 Anchorage Depot, a train station in Anchorage, Alaska, US
 Anchorage tram stop, a station in Manchester, England, in the UK
 Anchorage-class dock landing ship, a U.S. series of ships

Other uses
 Anchorage (orthodontics), a technique used in dentistry
 Anchorage Gateway, a residential skyscraper in Salford Quays, England
 Anchorage, the cell of an anchorite, a hermit-like medieval monk
 The Anchorage (Easton, Maryland), a home on the U.S. National Register of Historic Places

See also
 Anchor (disambiguation)